Maximilian Kepler-Różycki (born February 10, 1993) is a German professional baseball outfielder for the Minnesota Twins of Major League Baseball (MLB). He made his MLB debut in 2015. Before signing with the Twins, he played for Buchbinder Legionäre Regensburg of Bundesliga. He bats and throws left-handed. He holds the record for home runs hit in a career by a German-born player.

Early life
Kepler was born in Berlin, Germany. His parents, Kathy Kepler and Marek Różycki, were both professional ballet dancers; they met when they performed in the same ballet company in Berlin. His mother is from San Antonio, Texas, while his father is from Poland. He has one sister.

At the age of six, Kepler started baseball at the Little League level with the John F. Kennedy School in Berlin. Though he received a scholarship at age seven to the Steffi Graf Tennis Foundation, he decided to choose baseball. Kepler attended John F. Kennedy School, and the St. Emmeram Academy in Regensburg in 2008, where he was able to train in baseball more than the average American teenager. He played association football with Hertha BSC, and played baseball for Buchbinder Legionäre Regensburg of the Bundesliga, the highest baseball league in Germany.

Minor leagues 
Andy Johnson, an international scout working for the Minnesota Twins of MLB, first noticed Kepler when he played in a junior national tournament at the age of 14. At  16, he signed with the Twins in 2009 for US$800,000, the largest signing bonus given by an MLB franchise to a European-born player. Kepler made his American debut in the rookie level in 2010 Gulf Coast League (GCL) with the GCL Twins. He was promoted to the Elizabethton Twins of the Rookie-Advanced Appalachian League in 2011. He was assigned to Elizabethton for the 2012 season. An elbow injury delayed the start of Kepler's 2013 season, when he was assigned to the Cedar Rapids Kernels of the Class A Midwest League. Following the regular season, the Twins assigned Kepler to the Glendale Desert Dogs of the Arizona Fall League.

After the 2013 season, the Twins added Kepler to their 40-man roster, and he was invited to spring training. Kepler played for the Fort Myers Miracle of the Class A-Advanced Florida State League in 2014, and opened the 2015 season with the Chattanooga Lookouts of the Class AA Southern League. Kepler was selected to represent the Twins at the 2015 All-Star Futures Game, though a sore shoulder prevented him from playing. Kepler finished the 2015 season with a .327 batting average, nine home runs, and 18 stolen bases. He was named Southern League Player of the Year.

MLB career 
The Twins promoted Kepler to the major leagues on September 21, 2015, the night after the Lookouts won the Southern League championship. He made his major league debut on September 27, 2015 and recorded his first hit on October 4, 2015. After Donald Lutz, Kepler is the second German-developed player to play in modern MLB.

The Twins assigned Kepler to the Rochester Red Wings of the Class AAA International League to start the 2016 season. After playing in two games for Rochester, the Twins promoted him to the major leagues to replace the injured Danny Santana on April 10, 2016. Fifteen days later, Kepler was optioned to Rochester. On June 1, 2016, Kepler was recalled to replace the injured Miguel Sanó, and he began getting regular starts for the Twins in right field. The next day, Kepler had his first multiple-hit game, and on June 12, Kepler swatted his first major league home run, a walk-off three-run shot in the 10th inning off of Matt Barnes of the Boston Red Sox. On August 1 against the Cleveland Indians, Kepler became the first European-born MLB player to hit three home runs in one game and the fifth Twins player to do so after Bob Allison, Harmon Killebrew, Tony Oliva, and Justin Morneau. On August 8, 2016, Kepler was named co-American League Player of the Week, his first time receiving that honor, alongside teammate Joe Mauer.

Kepler started opening day 2017 against the Kansas City Royals, and collected a hit in his first at bat. In a game against the Chicago White Sox on August 31, Kepler came up to bat in the bottom of the ninth with the bases loaded. Opposing pitcher Juan Minaya threw a slider inside and Kepler got hit by the pitch and became the second player in Twins history to have a walk-off hit-by-pitch. It gave the Twins their 20th win in August. Kepler finished the year with career highs in games played, with 147, batting average of .243, home runs with 19, and 69 RBIs. In 2018, Kepler had a batting average of .224 and hit 20 home runs with 58 RBIs in 156 games. His 20 home runs and 156 games played were both career highs.

Kepler signed a 5-year, $35 million contract on February 14, 2019. He won his second American League Player of the Week award for the week of May 26th, he led the MLB that week in batting average, on-base percentage, and slugging percentage with a line of .571/.600/1.190. He had his second career three-home-run game against the Cleveland Indians on June 6; all three home runs came against starting pitcher Trevor Bauer. In a game against the  Indians on July 13, Kepler hit two home runs in his first two at bats against opposing starting pitcher Trevor Bauer, those two home runs were the fourth and fifth straight home runs hit against Bauer in consecutive at bats. This was the first time in MLB history that a batter hit a home run in five consecutive at bats against the same pitcher during a single season. On August 16, 2019 Kepler hit his 33rd home run of the season, setting an MLB record for home runs in a single season by a European-born player, passing former Giants outfielder Bobby Thomson. He batted .252/.336/.519, and set career highs in home runs, runs, and hits, and he also led the major leagues in pull percentage (53.4%), and finished 20th in MVP voting.

Kepler started 2020 by hitting a home run on the first pitch of the season against the Chicago White Sox, following that with another home run in his second at bat. He became the second player to hit a home run in the first two innings in a season  following Ted Kluszewski of the Angels (April 11, 1961). Overall, Kepler finished with a .228 average with 9 home runs and 23 RBI in 48 games during the 60-game season.

In 2021, he batted .157 against left-handers, the lowest batting average in the major leagues.

During the 2022 season, Kepler was restricted from playing a three-games series against the Toronto Blue Jays due to his decision to not receive the COVID-19 vaccination.

Personal life
He was previously in a relationship with American soccer player Abby Dahlkemper.

References

External links 

1993 births
Living people
Cedar Rapids Kernels players
Chattanooga Lookouts players
Elizabethton Twins players
Fort Myers Miracle players
German expatriate baseball players in the United States
German people of American descent
German people of Polish descent
Glendale Desert Dogs players
Gulf Coast Twins players
Major League Baseball outfielders
Major League Baseball players from Germany
Minnesota Twins players
Rochester Red Wings players
Sportspeople from Berlin
St. Paul Saints players